The 7th Army Training Command (7th ATC) is a United States Army training organization located at Tower Barracks, Germany. 7th ATC comes under the command of the U.S. Army Europe (USAREUR). 7th ATC is the United States Army's largest overseas training command and responsible for providing and overseeing the training requirements for USAREUR soldiers as well as North Atlantic Treaty Organization (NATO) and partner-nation countries.

Shoulder sleeve insignia 
The training command's shoulder patch was originally approved for Seventh Army on 23 June 1943.

History 
In 1948, the Grafenwoehr Training Area was assigned to the 7th Army and designated a tank training center. In 1959, Grafenwoehr becomes headquarters of the Seventh Army Training Center, incorporating the Grafenwoehr and Hohenfels Training Areas to become the largest training complex in Germany. In 1975, Grafenwoehr becomes the headquarters for the Seventh U.S. Army Training Center, which becomes the Seventh Army Training Command the following year. As of January 2006, the 7th ATC became known as the 7th Army Joint Multinational Training Command. In July 2016, the 7th Army Joint Multinational Training Command was returned to its original designation as the 7th Army Training Command.

Purpose 
7th ATC provides dynamic training, preparing forces to execute Unified Land Operations and contingencies in support of the Combatant Commands, NATO, and other national requirements

7th ATC consists of seven subordinate directorates, comprising the Grafenwoehr Training Area; the Joint Multinational Readiness Center in Hohenfels; the Joint Multinational Simulation Center in Grafenwoehr; the 7th Army Combined Arms Training Center in Vilseck; the 7th Army Noncommissioned Officer Academy in Grafenwoehr; the International Special Training Centre in Pfullendorf; and the Training Support Activity, Europe at Grafenwoehr. The responsibility to provide community support for 7th ATC installations belongs to U.S. Army Garrison Bavaria. More than 15,000 soldiers and civilian employees and 9,500 family members make up the USAG Bavaria.

Subordinate units 
 7th Army Training Command, in Grafenwöhr
 Combined Arms Training Center, in Vilseck
 Grafenwöhr Training Area, in Grafenwöhr
 International Special Training Center, in Pfullendorf
 Joint Multinational Readiness Center, in Hohenfels
 Joint Multinational Simulation Center, in Grafenwöhr
 Noncommissioned Officers Academy, in Grafenwöhr
 Training Support Activity Europe, in Grafenwöhr
 Joint Multinational Training Group Ukraine, in Yavoriv, Ukraine
 Georgia Defense Readiness Program - Training, at Vaziani Military Base, Georgia

List of commanding generals

References

External links 

 

1958 establishments in Germany
Military units and formations established in 1958
Military units and formations of the United States in the Cold War
Organisations based in Bavaria
Training units and formations of the United States Army
United States military in Germany